St. Francis Xavier Church is a Catholic parish located at 611 Sycamore Street, Cincinnati, Ohio. This was the location of the first diocesan cathedral and the center of early Catholic life in the city. It was dedicated to St. Peter on December 17, 1826. 

Christ Church, founded in 1819, the city's first Catholic church, was located at Vine and Liberty streets, in the "Northern Liberties" area, at the time outside of the city. A story that the church had to be built on the outskirts of the city because anti-Catholic prejudice prevented a Catholic church within city limits has been shown to be false by church historians. Its frame building was moved on wheels to Sycamore Street in 1826 to serve as the first seminary. Saint Francis Seraph Church now is on the former site, on land purchased from James Findlay.

St. Francis Xavier has existed as its own parish since 1845 when the cathedral was moved to Saint Peter In Chains Cathedral at Eight & Plum Streets. The parish has been under the direction of the Society of Jesus (Jesuits) since 1840. The present brick edifice with stone facing and ornate clock tower was built in 1860.

Xavier University and St. Xavier High School were founded next to the St. Xavier Church. Both institutions have since moved to separate locations due to space constraints and expansion. Today the church serves the downtown community.

Gallery

See also
 List of Jesuit sites
 St. Xavier Commercial School

References

Saint Xavier Parish Profile

External links

St. Xavier Church official website
St. Xavier College
St. Xavier Parish School, 520 Sycamore Street

Roman Catholic churches in Cincinnati
National Register of Historic Places in Cincinnati
Religious organizations established in 1845
19th-century Roman Catholic church buildings in the United States
1845 establishments in Ohio
Cincinnati Local Historic Landmarks
Roman Catholic churches completed in 1860